Carborazine is a six-membered aromatic ring with two carbon atoms, two nitrogen atoms and two boron atoms in opposing pairs.

See also
 1,2-Dihydro-1,2-azaborine — an aromatic chemical compound with properties intermediate between benzene and borazine.
 Borazine

References

Aromatic compounds
Boron heterocycles
Nitrogen heterocycles
Six-membered rings
Boron–nitrogen compounds